Annamarie Phelps CBE ( Stapleton, born 24 May 1966), is a British rower and sports administrator. She competed in the women's eight event at the 1996 Summer Olympics. She was Chairman of British Rowing from 2013 to 2018, and became Vice-Chairman of the British Olympic Association in 2017. She was chair of the British Horseracing Authority from June 2019 to June 2022.

Phelps was appointed Commander of the Order of the British Empire (CBE) in the 2016 New Year Honours, for services to rowing.

References

External links
 

1966 births
Living people
British female rowers
Olympic rowers of Great Britain
Rowers at the 1996 Summer Olympics
Sportspeople from Bradford
Stewards of Henley Royal Regatta
Commanders of the Order of the British Empire
Horse racing administrators